Timothy Yates (1935 – 16 January 2016) was a British canon, theological educator, missiologist and historian.

Yates was the Warden of Cranmer Hall, the Anglican theological college that forms part of St John's College, Durham, from 1971 to 1979. Under his headship, the college first admitted women in 1973. In 1979, he wrote the first history of the college in celebration of its 70th anniversary. From 2008 until his death, he was a member of the college's Development Board, fundraising and consulting on a proposed Learning Resource Centre.

He died on 16 January 2016. A public service of thanksgiving was held on 2 February, and a private memorial and burial was held for his family during the next school holiday.

Career 
 1960-63 - Curate of Tonbridge (Diocese of Rochester)
 1963-71 - Tutor at St John's College, Durham
 1971-79 - Warden of Cranmer Hall, St John's College, Durham
 1979-82 - Priest-in-Charge of Darley with South Darley (Diocese of Derby)
 1982-90 - Rector of Darley
 1985-95 - Derby Diocesan Director of Ordinands
 1989-2000 - Honorary Canon of Derby Cathedral
 1990-2000 - Curate of Ashford-in-the-Water with Sheldon and Great Longstone

Books 
 Venn and Victorian Bishops Abroad (1978)
 Christian Mission in the Twentieth Century (1994)
 The Expansion of Christianity (2004)
 Pioneer Missionary, Evangelical Statesman: A Life of A. T. (Tim) Houghton (2011)
 The Conversion of the Maori: Years of Religious and Social Change (1814-1842) (2013)

References

Staff of Cranmer Hall, Durham
1935 births
Church of England priests
20th-century English Anglican priests
Living people
British theologians
British historians of religion